Lieutenant James Knowles, Jr. (1896–1971) was a World War I flying ace credited with five aerial victories. He was one of the final aces in the war.

Knowles was a Harvard student who was accepted into the U.S. Army Air Service in April 1917. In June 1918, he reported to the 95th Aero Squadron for duty as a Spad XIII pilot. Between 25 July and 8 November 1918, he shot down three German Fokker D.VIIs and two Rumpler reconnaissance planes; one of the latter victories was shared with Sumner Sewall and three other pilots. He came out of the war as an ace with the Distinguished Service Cross with Oak Leaf Cluster, the Croix de Guerre, and the Aero Club of America Medal.

See also

 List of World War I flying aces from the United States

References

Bibliography
 American Aces of World War I. Norman Franks, Harry Dempsey. Osprey Publishing, 2001. , .

External links

1896 births
1971 deaths
Recipients of the Distinguished Service Cross (United States)
American World War I flying aces
Harvard University alumni